Zara Aleksandrovna Levina (born February 5 (O.S. January 25), 1906, in Simferopol, Russian Empire – June 27, 1976, in Moscow) was a Soviet pianist and composer.

She was from a Jewish family. Zara Levina studied piano in the Odessa Conservatory, which she passed with a gold medal. She graduated from the Moscow Conservatory in 1932, where she had studied piano and composition.

In her early age, Zara Levina admired the composers Rachmaninoff, Scriabin, Prokofiev, Beethoven and Schumann. She mainly wrote choral works (mostly romances, then children's songs) and, besides, also other vocal music, as well as two piano concertos and solo piano works. The inspiration of those five composers is evident throughout her works.  Both of her piano concertos have been recorded, as has her 1928 first violin sonata (by David Oistrakh). She was married to the composer Nikolai Chemberdzhi (1903–1948). Her grandson is the pianist Alexander Melnikov.  Her granddaughter is the pianist and composer Katia Tchemberdji.

Recordings
 2017 Zara Levina: The Piano Concertos, Capriccio C5269
 Rundfunk-Sinfonieorchester Berlin, Ariane Matiakh, conductor; Maria Lettberg, piano soloist
 2019 Zara Levina: Piano Sonatas Nos. 1 & 2; Violin Sonata; Poeme; Canzonetta; Hebrew Rhapsody, Capriccio C5356
 Maria Lettberg, piano; Yury Revich, violin; Gernot Adrion, viola; Ringela Riemke, cello; Katia Tchemberdji, piano

References
 Levina page from van Rijen Soviet Composer Site
MUGI

External links
 

1906 births
1976 deaths
Musicians from Simferopol
Ukrainian Jews
Jewish classical musicians
Women classical composers
20th-century classical composers
Soviet classical composers
Moscow Conservatory alumni
20th-century women composers